Gienah was the traditional name of two stars, each marking a wing (Arabic al janāħ) of its constellation:

 Gamma Corvi aka Gienah Corvi, in Corvus
 Epsilon Cygni aka Gienah Cygni, in Cygnus

The International Astronomical Union approved the name Gienah for Gamma Corvi A in 2016 and Aljanah for Epsilon Cygni Aa in 2017.

References